Army Men 3D is a third-person shooter video game developed and published by The 3DO Company exclusively for PlayStation.

Reception 

The game received an average score of 67.67% at GameRankings, based on an aggregate of 10 reviews.

The game was the 9th best-selling game in April 1999.

References

External links

1999 video games
Army Men
PlayStation (console) games
PlayStation (console)-only games
Single-player video games
Third-person shooters
Video games developed in the United States